The 2012 Georgia Tech Yellow Jackets football team represented the Georgia Institute of Technology in the 2012 NCAA Division I FBS football season. The Yellow Jackets were led by fifth year head coach Paul Johnson and played their home games at Bobby Dodd Stadium. They were members of the Coastal Division of the Atlantic Coast Conference. They finished the season 7–7, 5–3 in ACC play to share the Coastal Division Championship with Miami and North Carolina. With Miami and North Carolina on post seasons bans, Georgia Tech represented the division in the ACC Championship Game where they were defeated by Florida State. They were invited to the Sun Bowl where they defeated USC.

Previous season
They finished the 2011 Season at 8–5, 5–3 in ACC play to finish in a tie for second place in the Coastal Division. They were invited to the Sun Bowl where they were defeated by Utah 30-27 in OT.

Schedule

Rankings

References

Georgia Tech
Georgia Tech Yellow Jackets football seasons
Sun Bowl champion seasons
Georgia Tech Yellow Jackets football